Sergey Petrovich Mikhailov (Russian: Сергей Петрович Михайлов; born 22 May 1965) is a Russian politician who is currently the senator from the Legislative Assembly of Zabaykalsky Krai since 18 October 2018.

Since 9 March 2022, he has been under personal EU sanctions.

Early life
Mikhailov was born on 22 May 1965. Between 1997 and 2008 he was the director of the Nerchinsk Agricultural College.

Political career
He had been a deputy of the Nerchinsk District Council of two convocations from 2000 to 2008. He became a deputy of the Legislative Assembly of Zabaykalsky Krai in 2008. Since September 2013, he was the Chairman of the Committee on Agrarian Policy and the Consumer Market. He was then promoted as the First Deputy Chairman of the Legislative Assembly in October 2016. In February 2016, Mikhailov had been the Acting Chairman of the Legislative Assembly of Zabaikalsky Krai.

Since 2013, he headed the regional branch of United Russia party in Transbaikalia.

On 27 September 2018, 35 members of the Legislative Assembly out of 48 who were present at the meeting voted to empower Mikhailov with the powers of a member of the Federation Council – a representative of the legislative body of state power of the Zabaikasky Krai. 

On 8 October, Mikhailov's powers were confirmed by the Federation Council.

References

Living people
1968 births
United Russia politicians
21st-century Russian politicians
People from Nerchinsky District
Members of the Federation Council of Russia (after 2000)